Vladimir Efimovich Titorenko (born 1958) is a Russian diplomat and is a former Ambassador Extraordinary and Plenipotentiary of the Russian Federation to the People's Democratic Republic of Algeria.
He was the Russian Ambassador to Qatar and Iraq.

On July 6, 2003, a convoy of Russian diplomats and journalistes was attacked outside Baghdad as it was fleeing embassy in Baghdad for Syria.
Of whom five were wounded. Russian convoy came into an area where US firefight with Iraqi forces were engaged.

Vladimir Titorenko accused American troops of firing on his convoy.

See also 
 Embassy of Russia in Algiers

References 

1958 births
Living people
Ambassador Extraordinary and Plenipotentiary (Russian Federation)
Ambassadors of Russia to Algeria
Ambassadors of Russia to Qatar
Ambassadors of Russia to Iraq
Ambassadors of Russia to the Central African Republic
Recipients of the Order of Courage